Rachel O'Connor may refer to:

Rachel O'Connor, character in Tales of the Slayers: Broken Bottle of Djinn
Rachel O'Connor, candidate in Kingston upon Thames local elections
Rachel O'Connor in 2013 Canadian Junior Curling Championships
Rachael O'Connor, singer